The Dickenson County Courthouse is a historic courthouse building located at Clintwood, Dickenson County, Virginia.  It was built in 1915, as an extension of the 1894 brick courthouse.  It is a two-story, Colonial Revival building with a projecting central block and wings.  It features a two-story portico with paired Ionic order columns, Palladian windows, and a slate-shingled hipped roof crowned by a domed clock tower. The 1894 brick courthouse was replaced in 1972.

It was listed on the National Register of Historic Places in 1982.

References

National Register of Historic Places in Dickenson County, Virginia
Buildings and structures in Dickenson County, Virginia
Colonial Revival architecture in Virginia
County courthouses in Virginia
Government buildings completed in 1915
Courthouses on the National Register of Historic Places in Virginia